Mukry is a town in Köýtendag District, Lebap Province, Turkmenistan. It is located near Kerki and Amu Dar'ya.

Etymology
Mukry is the name of a Turkmen tribe. The town was named Akgumdänajy ( Акгумдәнаҗы) at some point but the name Mukry was restored after construction of the railway station.

Economy
Mukry is the location of a gypsum mine.

Transportation
Mukry features a station on the rail line connecting Kerki to the Kelif border crossing into Uzbekistan, and is on the P-37 highway. A rail spur and a road connect it to the city of Magdanly.

References

Populated places in Lebap Region